Antonio "Teo" Teocoli (born 25 February 1945) is an Italian actor, TV conductor, singer and writer appearing in about 30 mostly Italian productions since 1975.

Selected filmography 

 Paolo e Francesca (1971)
 The Boss and the Worker (1975)
 L'Italia s'è rotta (1976)
 Sturmtruppen (1976)
 Valentina, una ragazza che ha fretta (1977)
 L'inquilina del piano di sopra (1978)
 Il balordo (1978)
 L'imbranato (1979)
 Saxophone (1979)
 Liquirizia (1979)
 Profumo di classe (1979)
 Ciao marziano (1980)
 L'onorevole con l'amante sotto il letto (1981)
 Spaghetti a mezzanotte (1981)
 Una vacanza bestiale (1981)
 Tutto compreso (1981)
 Si ringrazia la regione Puglia per averci fornito i milanesi (1982)
 Stormtroopers II (1982)
 Eccezzziunale... veramente (1982)
 Drive in (1983)
 Diego al 100% (1984)
 Grand Hotel (1985)
 Grandi magazzini  (1986)
 Missione eroica – I pompieri 2  (1987)
 Tutti in palestra (1987)
 My First Forty Years (1987)
 Days of Inspector Ambrosio (1988)
 Abbronzatissimi (1991)
 I tre moschettieri (1991)
 L'odissea (1991)
 Mai dire TV (1991)
 I vicini di casa (1992)
 Croce e delizia (1995)
 Papà dice messa (1996)
 Bibo per sempre (2000)
 Bar Sport  (2011)
 I 2 soliti idioti (2012)
 Forever Young (2016)
 ''Striscia La Notizia (2022)

References

External links 

1945 births
Living people
Italian male actors